The Cigar Lake Mine is a large high-grade underground uranium mine, located in the uranium-rich Athabasca Basin of northern Saskatchewan, Canada, at the south-west corner of Waterbury Lake. The deposit, discovered in 1981, is second in size of high-grade deposits only to the nearby McArthur River mine. Other deposits, such as Olympic Dam in Australia, contain more uranium but at lower grades.

History
Full-scale construction began in 2005 with production originally planned for 2007, but the mine experienced a catastrophic water inflow in October 2006, which flooded the mine. A second inflow occurred in 2008 during the first attempt at dewatering the mine after sealing the initial inflow. Remediation efforts continued, and re-entry was successfully accomplished in 2010. Production was delayed several times with the startup dates being announced for 2011, 2013, and 2014.

Its age is estimated to be 1.3 billion years. Due to natural containment and lack of any traces of radioactive elements on the surface, the deposit is used as an example of an effective natural deep geological repository.

During 2020, production was temporarily suspended over two periods due to the risks posed by the COVID-19 pandemic: from March  until September; and then from 14 December 2020. Production at Orano's McClean Lake uranium mill, which processes the ore from the Cigar Lake mine, was also suspended.

The Canadian Nuclear Safety Commission took regulatory action against owners Cameco Corporation in October 2022 due to the volume of waste material placed on waste pile C.

Reserves and resources

Ownership 
The mine is owned by Cameco Corporation (50.025%), AREVA Resources Canada Inc (37.1%), Idemitsu Canada Resources Ltd. (7.875%), and TEPCO Resources Inc. (5%). Cameco is the project operator.

Wolf attacks
In 2005, a worker was killed by wolves at Points North Landing, near Cameco's Rabbit Lake mine.

On August 29, 2016, a 26-year-old shift worker walking between buildings at the Cigar Lake mine on his midnight break was attacked and mauled by a lone timber wolf. A nearby security guard frightened the wolf away, administered first aid, and called for an air ambulance which airlifted him  to a hospital in Saskatoon where he recovered. After the attack, authorities ordered that area wolves be shot, that food disposal systems and fencing be inspected, and that staff be educated.

See also
 Uranium market
 Unconformity uranium deposits
 Cigar Lake Airport
 Cluff Lake mine 
 Key Lake mine
 McClean Lake mine
 Rabbit Lake mine
 List of wolf attacks in North America

References

External links
 

Uranium mines in Canada
Mines in Saskatchewan
Underground mines in Canada